Diebé is a small town and commune in the Cercle of Dioila in the Koulikoro Region of southern Mali. As of 1998 the commune had a population of 5958.

References

Communes of Koulikoro Region